Francis Asbury Morris (1817 – 1881) was an attorney general of the Republic of Texas.  He subsequently left the practice of law and became a Methodist minister.

Morris was born in Ohio in 1817 to Thomas Asbury Morris, later a Methodist bishop, and his wife Abigail Scales Morris.  He attended the University of Ohio and graduated from Augusta College.  He studied law and was admitted to the Ohio Bar in 1838.

The following year he moved to Texas to practice law and was named Attorney General in 1841 at the age of 24.

Later that year he went home to visit his sick mother who died in 1842.  This event profoundly influenced the young Morris.  He decided to change careers and go into the ministry.

He became professor of languages at St. Charles College (Missouri) in 1842.  He married Mary Fielding in 1845, who was the daughter of the school's late President and a first cousin of Julia Dent, who later married Ulysses S. Grant.

He was a circuit riding minister and pastor in Missouri for the next several decades.

He died in 1881 and was buried in St. Louis, Missouri.

References 

The American Illustrated Methodist Magazine, Volume 1 - The Grants' Marriage
Annals of Methodism in Missouri - Francis Asbury Morris
Handbook of Texas Online - Francis Asbury Morris
West Virginia Historical Magazine Quarterly, Volumes 4-5 - Bishop Thomas Asbury Morris

1817 births
1881 deaths
Texas Attorneys General
19th-century Methodist ministers
Augusta College (Kentucky) alumni
19th-century American lawyers